Amphibolia is a genus of bristle flies in the family Tachinidae.

Subgenera & Species
Amphibolia Macquart, 1844
Amphibolia albocincta (Malloch, 1930)
Amphibolia campbelli Paramonov, 1950
Amphibolia commoni Paramonov, 1968
Amphibolia ignorata Paramonov, 1950
Amphibolia papuana Crosskey, 1973
Amphibolia valentina Macquart, 1844
Amphibolia wilsoni Paramonov, 1950
Paramphibolia Brauer & von Bergenstamm, 1891
Amphibolia assimilis (Macquart, 1851)
Amphibolia stolida (Malloch, 1929)

References 

Diptera of Australasia
Tachinidae genera
Dexiinae
Taxa named by Pierre-Justin-Marie Macquart